The 2007 Malaysia FA Cup was the 18th season of the Malaysia FA Cup. The competition began on 6 February 2007, and ended with the final on 30 June 2007. Batu Kawan Stadium hosted the final match. A record 22 teams competed in the competition.

The tournament was won by Kedah, who defeated Perlis 4–2 in a penalty shoot-out.

First round

Second round

Quarter-finals
The first legs were played on 15 May and 22 May. The second legs were played on 29 May 2007.

|}

Semi-finals
The semi-final matches were played on 16 June and 23 June 2007.

|}

Final
The final was held at Batu Kawan Stadium, Penang on the June 30, 2007.

References

 
Piala FA
2007 domestic association football cups